The 2014–15 New Jersey Devils season was the 41st season for the National Hockey League franchise that was established on June 11, 1974, and 33rd season since the franchise relocated from Colorado prior to the 1982–83 NHL season. The Devils missed the playoffs for the third straight year.

Standings

Suspensions/fines

Schedule and results

Pre-season

Regular season

Player statistics
Final stats
Skaters

Goaltenders

†Denotes player spent time with another team before joining the Devils. Stats reflect time with the Devils only.
‡Denotes player was traded mid-season.  Stats reflect time with the Devils only.
Bold/italics denotes franchise record.

Notable achievements

Awards

Milestones

Transactions 
The Devils have been involved in the following transactions during the 2014–15 season.

Trades

Free agents acquired

Free agents lost

Claimed via waivers

Lost via waivers

Players released

Player signings

Lost via retirement

Draft picks

Below are the New Jersey Devils' selections made at the 2014 NHL Entry Draft, held on June 27–28, 2014, at the Wells Fargo Center in Philadelphia, Pennsylvania. The team finished the previous season ranked 20th in the league, but were relegated to select 30th overall for attempting to circumvent the salary cap in 2010.

Draft notes

 New Jersey will pick 30th overall in the first round. The Devils were expected to forfeit their first-round pick in 2014 (they elected to keep their first-round picks in 2011, 2012 and 2013) as the result of a penalty sanction due to cap circumvention when signing Ilya Kovalchuk. The penalty also included a fine of $3 million and the forfeit of the Devils' third round pick in 2011. The NHL partially rescinded the penalty keeping all of the penalties, except for modifying the first-round pick and reducing the fine to $1.5 million.
 New Jersey's fourth-round pick will go to the Winnipeg Jets as the result of a trade on February 13, 2013, that sent Alexei Ponikarovsky to New Jersey in exchange for a seventh-round pick in 2013 and this pick.
  The Florida Panthers' sixth-round pick will go to New Jersey as the result of a trade on September 28, 2013, that sent Krys Barch and St. Louis' seventh-round pick in 2015 to Florida in exchange for Scott Timmins and this pick.
 New Jersey's seventh-round pick will go to Arizona as the result of a trade on April 3, 2013, that sent Steve Sullivan to New Jersey in exchange for this pick.

References

New Jersey Devils seasons
New Jersey Devils
New Jersey Devils
New Jersey Devils
New Jersey Devils
21st century in Newark, New Jersey